Fernande Caroen (27 July 1920, Ostend – 16 April 1998, Ostend) was a Belgian freestyle swimmer. She participated in the 1948 Summer Olympics and finished fourth in the 400m freestyle event. She won two bronze medals in the same event at the 1938 and 1947 European Aquatics Championships.

References

1920 births
Olympic swimmers of Belgium
Swimmers at the 1948 Summer Olympics
Belgian female freestyle swimmers
1998 deaths
European Aquatics Championships medalists in swimming
Sportspeople from Ostend